Arcugnano is a town in the province of Vicenza, Veneto, north-eastern Italy. It is located south of A4 motorway. It is home to the food company Bertagni, the oldest filled pasta producer in Italy.

Sources
(Google Maps)

References

Cities and towns in Veneto